The 2018–19 Liiga season was the 44th season of the Liiga (formerly SM-liiga), the top level of ice hockey in Finland, since the league's formation in 1975.

Teams

Regular season
Top six advanced straight to the quarter-finals, while teams between 7th and 10th positions played a wild card round for the final two spots. The Liiga is a closed series and thus there is no relegation.

Rules for classification: 1) Points; 2) 3-point wins 3) Goal difference; 4) Goals scored; 4) Head-to-head points.

Playoffs

Bracket

Wild card round

Quarterfinals

Semifinals

Bronze medal game

Finals 

HPK wins the finals 4-3.

Final rankings

See also
 2018–19 Mestis season

References

External links 
Official site 

Liiga seasons
Liiga
Liiga